Taiwan Broadcasting System (TBS), founded 1 July 2006, is a public broadcasting group that operates 8 television channels in Taiwan. It also owns 2 (CTS and PTS) of the five major Taiwan television networks (the other are TTV, CTV and FTV).

Channels
CTS
CTS Main Channel
CTS Education and Culture
CTS News and Information
Parliamentary Channel 
PTS
PTS Main Channel
PTS Taigi
PTS HD
Hakka TV

External links
 Taiwan Broadcasting System official website

 
2006 establishments in Taiwan
Television stations in Taiwan
Television channels and stations established in 2006
Public broadcasting in Taiwan